"Tuned to a Different Station" is a song by English punk rock band Dogs and is featured on their debut album, Turn Against This Land. Released on 2 May 2005, it was the third single taken from the album and it charted in the UK Top 40 at No.29.

Media appearances
The song appears on the soundtrack for the 2005 video game Burnout Revenge.

Track listing
"Tuned to a Different Station" - 4:11
"You Don't Know What You Know" - 2:54
"The Long, Long Waterfall" - 5:00

2005 singles
2005 songs
Island Records singles